The Red Line is a rapid transit line of the Doha Metro. It runs north-south through Doha and its southern terminus of Al Wakrah and its northern terminus of Lusail, with a spur serving Hamad International Airport. It is the first line of the system, with the first segment opened on 8 May 2019.

Operation
At first, the line was only open from 8am to 11pm Sunday-Thursday. Later, it also added weekend hours of 2pm-11pm on Friday and 6am-11pm on Saturday, and also extended the timings to 6am-11pm during weekdays. Thus, it now runs on all days except Friday from 6 am to 11 pm, and on Friday it runs from 2 pm to 11 pm.

Stations

References

Doha Metro
Rapid transit in Qatar
2019 establishments in Qatar
Railway lines opened in 2019